Ternay may refer to the following places in France:

 Ternay, Loir-et-Cher, a commune in the Loir-et-Cher department
 Ternay, Rhône, a commune in the Rhône department
 Ternay, Vienne, a commune in the Vienne department
 Ternay River, a river in France